Elmer Stephen Hall (born September 12, 1866) was a politician from the U.S. state of Wisconsin.  He served as Brown County Clerk, Green Bay's 26th Mayor, Wisconsin's twenty-first Secretary of State, Conservation Commissioner and District 2 Wisconsin State Senate serving one term.  He was a Republican.

He died May 22, 1952.

Notes

References

1866 births
1952 deaths
Mayors of Green Bay, Wisconsin
Republican Party Wisconsin state senators
Secretaries of State of Wisconsin